Senator Bunn may refer to:

Henry Gaston Bunn (1838–1908), Arkansas State Senate
Jim Bunn (born 1956), Oregon State Senate
Stan Bunn (born 1946), Oregon State Senate